Bogusław Gierajewski (born 4 June 1937) is a Polish sprinter. He competed in the men's 4 × 400 metres relay at the 1960 Summer Olympics.

References

1937 births
Living people
Athletes (track and field) at the 1960 Summer Olympics
Athletes (track and field) at the 1964 Summer Olympics
Polish male sprinters
Polish male hurdlers
Olympic athletes of Poland
Athletes from Warsaw
20th-century Polish people